Onchidiopsis groenlandica is a species of relatively large sea snail with a transparent internal shell, a marine gastropod mollusk in the family Velutinidae. Because the shell is mostly internal, the snail resembles a sea slug in general appearance.

Distribution

Description 
The maximum recorded (shell?) length is 95 mm.

Habitat 
The minimum recorded depth for this species is 27 m; maximum recorded depth is 137 m.

References

Velutinidae
Gastropods described in 1853